The First Lady is the fourth studio album by American singer Faith Evans. Released by Capitol Records, 
it marked Evans' debut (and her only release) on the EMI subsidiary, following her departure from Bad Boy Records in 2003. Despite this, the singer reunited with much of her frequent contributors to work on the album, including The Neptunes, Chucky Thompson, and Mario Winans. Duo Carvin & Ivan of Karma Productions wrote and produced the predominant part of all songs that were included in the final track listing.

Generally well received by critics, The First Lady debuted at number two on the U.S. Billboard 200 and number one on the U.S. Top R&B/Hip-Hop albums with opening week sales of 157,000 units. It remains Evans' highest ranking album on either chart, and the best first week sales of her career. By the end of 2005, the album was certified gold by the Recording Industry Association of America, denoting shipments exceeding 500,000 in the United States alone. In support of the album, Evans embarked on a concert tour, The First Lady Tour, in the United States and Europe in mid-2005. In 2006, The First Lady was nominated for Best Female R&B/Soul Album at the 20th Soul Train Music Awards.

Background and release
The title of the album was inspired by Evans' original nickname with Bad Boy Records, "The First Lady of Bad Boy." On her decision to use a truncated version of the name Diddy dubbed her with, Evans commented: "[The nickname] did carry over, 'cause I'm the first artist in my genre at Capitol," she said. "More so, I chose the title The First Lady because a lot of my personality reminds me of people like Jacqueline Kennedy Onassis and Hillary Clinton. [...] Of course, they go through things, 'cause they're human like all of us. But when you see the first lady, you regard her [as] being the first lady. [...] I've made it my business to try and handle certain turbulence in my life with a certain dignity and [remain] ladylike."

Critical response

The First Lady received positive reviews from most music critics upon its release. At Metacritic, which assigns a normalized rating out of 100 to reviews from mainstream critics, the album received an average score of 72, based on 17 reviews, which indicates "generally favorable reviews". In his review for Allmusic, Andy Kellman wrote that "if there was any creative block during [Evans'] time away, it doesn't show. In fact, The First Lady proves that she only gets better with time, as she goes through more ups and downs and continues to absorb her inspirations." He called the first four tracks the highlights of the album, which he rated four out of five stars, and went on to praise The First Lady, calling it as "well-rounded as an R&B album gets, regardless of the age it's part of. In review of her 2010 album Something About Faith he called The First Lady "one of Faith Evans' strongest albums". It smartly incorporates throwback aspects into state-of-the-art pop-soul." Belinda Boakye from The Situation complimented the "unfailing spirit and soul" on the album, giving it a score of 3.5 out of 5, and commented that "this long anticipated album marks a metamorphosis for Faith Evans into a state of musical autonomy. With 52 minutes of silky vocals and a variation of infectious beats and slow sultry rhythm and blues, this record has all the ingredients needed making it emulate the class and tightly toned sound of Evans’ new physical appearance."

The Washington Post gave it a positive review, stating, "No further proof is needed than The First Lady, a CD that sounds remarkably humble despite its title. It's not her term, anyway. The industry gave it to her—with the appendage "of hip-hop soul"—after she started running in the same circles as Sean "P. Diddy" Combs and Notorious B.I.G. back in the mid-1990s. She's still known as Biggie's widow, even though she married her chief musical collaborator, Todd Russaw, a while back. But all the drama and the sorrow barely matter at this point, because on The First Lady it's the stability that counts." Blogcritics also gave it a favorable review, stating that it "is a musical mood ring, encapsulating and displaying the last ten years of her life. It’s not all reflective, however, as there are plenty of party worthy tracks spread between the affecting intensity and veteran of the game vocals. [...] Evans has released a remarkable album with wide appeal and emotional depth for the more cautious listeners. It doesn’t transcend genres or attempt to reconstruct R&B, but First Lady will surely impress those with a taste for evocative bluesy vocals, dance numbers, and solid slow jams."

Sal Cinquemani from Slant gave the album three out of five stars and said "The First Lady is decidedly less "street," boasting a more adult sound that's timely enough to keep longtime fans and possibly even earn new ones." Though he dismissed songs such as "Ever Wonder," "Until You Came" and "Stop N Go," which he declared as either "cloying" or "sappy," he found that the album was "a mark of growth for Evans" following her slip from Bad Boy and Sean "Diddy" Combs. Orlando Lima, writing for Vibe, also gave the album three-and-a-half out of five stars and noted that while "Evans can still finesse notes," the album had a tendency to backtracking, "covering much of the same ground as her previous offering [...] instead of continually pushing her sound into the future." He found that Evans yet had to "sway the R&B world with the weight of say, Sade's Lovers Rock or Mary J. Blige's My Life."

Commercial performance
Despite the somewhat average commercial performance of the album's leading single, "Again," The First Lady peaked at number two on the Billboard 200, the official albums chart in the United States, on April 23, 2005. The album sold 157,000 units in its first week of release, falling just 8,000 copies short of the top slot and 50 Cent's The Massacre. Despite this, the album gave Evans her best sales figures of her career yet, marking both her highest-selling debut and best ever first-week sales. In addition, The First Lady became her first album to reach number-one on the Top R&B/Hip-Hop Albums chart, surpassing The Massacre. By the end of 2005, the album was certified gold by the Recording Industry Association of America (RIAA), and became the 158th best-selling album of that year in the US.

Tour

In support of the album, Evans embarked on the tour at the WAMO Summer Jam concert in Pittsburgh, Pennsylvania on June 18, 2005, where she was joined by singer Teairra Mari and rappers Master P, Common, and Cassidy. The American leg of the tour concluded at the House of Blues in West Hollywood, California on August 31, 2005, and was supported by opening acts Anthony David and Keke Wyatt. Kameelah Williams, former lead singer of the R&B group 702, served as a backing vocalist during the concerts.

Track listing

Notes
  denotes co-producer

Sample credits
"Again" contains samples of "Genuine", written by Jerry Harris and Venus Dodson, performed by The Whatnauts.
"I Don't Need It" contains elements of "Nights Over Egypt", written by Dexter Wansel and Cynthia Biggs, performed by The Jones Girls.
"Mesmerized" contains interpolations from "Who's Making Love", written by Homer Banks, Bettye Crutcher, Don Davis and Raymond Jackson, performed by Johnnie Taylor, and "Footin' It", written by George Benson and Donald Sebesky, performed by Benson.
"Jealous" contains a sample of "Esta Noche La Paso Contigo", written by Laura Barraza, performed by Los Ángeles Negros.

Credits and personnel

 Tony Aliperti – guitar
 Ben Briggs – engineer
 Russ Brown – guitar
 Matt Cappy – trumpet
 Mike Caren – engineer
 Andrew Coleman – engineer
 Duro – mixing
 Bryan Ellis – assistant engineer
 Serban Ghenea – mixing
 Carvin Haggins – engineer
 Eric Hunter – engineer
 Manny Marroquin – mixing
 Rod Morgan – keyboard
 Todd Russaw – executive producer
 Andrew M. Shack – executive producer
 Andrew Slater – vocal producer
 Jay Shawn Smith – vocal assistance
 Frank Sutton – engineer
 Phil Tan – mixing
 Brad Todd – engineer, mixing
 Harley White – bass
 Howard Willing – engineer

Charts

Weekly charts

Year-end charts

Certifications

See also 
 List of Billboard number-one R&B/hip-hop albums of 2005

References

2005 albums
Faith Evans albums
Capitol Records albums
Albums produced by Bryan-Michael Cox
Albums produced by the Neptunes
Albums produced by Jermaine Dupri